Matty Kemp (September 10, 1907 – December 12, 1999) was an American film actor. He appeared in more than 50 films between 1926 and 1943.

After retiring from acting, Kemp produced many musical short films. In 1954, he contributed the story for the Jane Russell musical film The French Line. 

A close friend of actor and musician Charles "Buddy" Rogers and his wife Mary Pickford, Kemp was an early manager of the Mary Pickford Foundation. Under his supervision, the organization made fine grains and dupe negatives of 29 of Pickford's features and 28 of her Biograph shorts.

Partial filmography

 Rustlers' Ranch (1926) - Clem Allen
 The Magnificent Flirt (1928) - Hubert
 The Good-Bye Kiss (1928) - Bill Williams
 The Campus Vamp (1928, Short) - Matty
 The Million Dollar Collar (1929) - Bill Holmes
 Common Clay (1930) - Arthur Coakley
 City Streets (1931) - Man Stabbed with Fork (uncredited)
 One More Chance (1931, Short) - Percy Howard
 Air Eagles (1931) - Eddie Ramsey
 Probation (1932) - Bert
 Thrill of Youth (1932) - Chet Thayer
 Down to Earth (1932) - Ross Peters
 The Phantom of Crestwood (1932) - Frank Andes
 Tess of the Storm Country (1932) - Dillon (uncredited)
 Wine, Women and Song (1933) - Ray Joyce
 Justice Takes a Holiday (1933) - Larry Harrison
 City Park (1934) - Raymond Ransome
 Cross Streets (1934) - Ken Barclay
 His Night Out (1935) - Salesman (uncredited)
 Three Kids and a Queen (1935) - Reporter (uncredited)
 Dangerous Waters (1936) - Officer Garvey (uncredited)
 Tango (1936) - Anthony Thorne aka 'Tony' Carver
 The Crime of Dr. Forbes (1936) - Student Doctor (uncredited)
 House of Secrets (1936) - Man on Ship (uncredited)
 Red Lights Ahead (1936) - Jerry Carruthers (uncredited)
 A Star Is Born (1937) - Preview Reporter (uncredited)
 Criminals of the Air (1937) - Arnold (uncredited)
 Here's Flash Casey (1938) - Rodney Addison
 Saleslady (1938) - Wheeler
 Campus Confessions (1938) - Ed Riggs
 Law of the Texan (1938) - Ranger Jack Bryant
 I Demand Payment (1938) - Toby Locke
 Sudden Money (1939) - Sound Man (uncredited)
 Million Dollar Legs (1939) - Ed Riggs
 The Adventures of the Masked Phantom (1939) - Stan Barton
 Golden Gloves (1940) - Lefty (uncredited)
 Look Who's Laughing (1941) - Harry (uncredited)
 Cadet Girl (1941) - Phil - Musician (uncredited)
 Chatterbox (1943) - Reporter (uncredited) (final film role)
 The Road to Hollywood (1947) - Percy Howard, Bing's Rival, from 'One More Chance' (archive footage)
 Million Dollar Weekend (1948, Producer)

References

External links

1907 births
1999 deaths
20th-century American male actors
American male film actors
Male actors from New York City